Pileh Sehran (also Romanized as Pīleh Sehrān and Pīreh Sahrān) is a village in Yurchi-ye Sharqi Rural District, Kuraim District, Nir County, Ardabil Province, Iran. At the 2006 census, its population was 46, in 5 families.

References 

Tageo

Towns and villages in Nir County